Monodonta is a genus of moths of the family Crambidae. It contains only one species, Monodonta passalis, which is described from Mount Kebea in New Guinea. The genus name is a junior homonym of Monodonta Lamarck, 1799 but no replacement name is currently available.

References

Moths described in 1907
Pyraustinae
Taxa named by George Hamilton Kenrick